Julius Caesar Hubbell (June 4, 1863 – October 17, 1949) was an American politician in the state of Washington. He served in the Washington House of Representatives from 1909 to 1933 for district 19.

References

Republican Party members of the Washington House of Representatives
1863 births
1949 deaths